The tallest structure in the world is the Burj Khalifa skyscraper at 828m (2716 feet). Listed are guyed masts (such as telecommunication masts), self-supporting towers (such as the CN Tower), skyscrapers (such as the Willis Tower), oil platforms, electricity transmission towers, and bridge support towers. This list is organized by absolute height. See List of tallest buildings and structures, List of tallest freestanding structures and List of tallest buildings and List of tallest towers for additional information about these types of structures.

Terminology
Terminological and listing criteria follow Council on Tall Buildings and Urban Habitat definitions. Guyed masts are differentiated from towers – the latter not featuring any guy wires or other support structures; and buildings are differentiated from towers – the former having at least 50% of occupiable floor space although both are self-supporting structures.

List by height

This list includes structures with a minimum height of { to keep the list to a reasonable length. List of tallest structures in the world – 300 to 400  and List of tallest structures in the world – 400 to 500  contain shorter structures.

For all structures, the pinnacle height is given, so the height of skyscrapers may differ from the values at List of skyscrapers. Tension-leg platforms are not included.

Structures (past or present) 600 m (1,969 ft) and taller

Structures (past or present) between 550 and 600 m (1,804 ft and 1,969 ft)

Structures (past or present) between 500 and 550 m (1,640 and 1,804 ft)

Structures taller than  under construction
It does not include on-hold or topped-out structures.

On hold
Structures that are on hold or have been cancelled.

List by continent

Current
The following table is a list of the current tallest structures by each continent (listed by geographic size):

All time
The following table is a list of the all time tallest structures by each continent (listed by geographic size):

See also

 List of tallest buildings and structures
 List of tallest structures – 400 to 500 metres
 List of tallest structures – 300 to 400 metres
 List of tallest structures built before the 20th century
 List of transmission sites
 List of European medium wave transmitters
 List of tallest buildings
 List of future tallest buildings
 List of tallest freestanding structures
 List of tallest bridges
 List of tallest dams
 List of cities with most skyscrapers
 List of tallest statues

References

External links
 World Federation of Great Towers
 Skyscrapers diagrams and forum
 Skyscrapers database
 Search for Radio Masts and Towers in the U.S.

 
Lists of buildings and structures
Towers
Guyed masts
Lists of construction records
Lists of tallest structures by region